Marko Aleksic (born September 10, 1996) is a soccer player who plays for the Alberta Golden Bears.

Career

Club
After three years with FC Edmonton's academy team, Aleksic was signed with FC Edmonton on February 5, 2014. Aleksic made his professional debut on April 27, 2014 as a half-time substitute in a 0-1 loss to Minnesota United. Aleksic would spend four seasons with FC Edmonton, before the club ceased operations after the 2017 season.

International
Aleksic began representing Canada at the U-20 level. He made his debut against Russia's U-21 team in a 2-1 victory on November 15, 2014.

References

External links
 FC Edmonton bio
 Canada West bio

1996 births
Living people
Canadian soccer players
FC Edmonton players
North American Soccer League players
Serbian emigrants to Canada
Canadian people of Serbian descent
Canada men's youth international soccer players
Association football defenders
Alberta Golden Bears players
Footballers from Belgrade
University and college soccer players in Canada